Crime in Stereo Is Dead is the third album by Crime in Stereo, released October 23, 2007. It is their first album on Bridge Nine Records.

Track listing
All songs written by Crime In Stereo
"XXXX (The First Thousand Years of Solitude)" – 2:42      
"Third Atlantic" – 2:42
"...But You are Vast" – 3:22
"Animal Pharm" – 3:00     
"Small Skeletal" – 3:06      
"Unfortunate Tourists" – 3:38   
"Nixon" – 3:28
"Vicious Teeth" – 3:26   
"Almost Ghostless/Above the Gathering Oceans" – 2:28      
"Orbiter" – 3:40      
"Choker" – 3:32

Credits
 Kristian Hallbert – vocals
 Alex Dunne – guitar
 Mike Musilli – bass
 Scotty Giffin – drums
 Dan McCabe – background vocals
 Produced and engineered by Mike Sapone

References

External links
Bridge 9 Records description of the band and the album

Crime in Stereo albums
2007 albums
Bridge 9 Records albums
Albums produced by Mike Sapone